Hino Motors Red Dolphins are a Japanese rugby union team, currently playing in the county's top tier Japan Rugby League One competition. The team is the rugby team of commercial vehicle manufacturer Hino Motors, based in Hino in the Tokyo Metropolis.

The team was founded in 1950, and spent their formative seasons playing in the Kanto League. They were promoted to the top division of the Top East League for the 2009 season, but were relegated in their first season. They bounced back at the first attempt, again winning promotion to the Top East League for the 2010 season. This time, they remained in that league until the 2017–18 season, when they won promotion to the newly formed Top Challenge League.

Season history

Hino Red Dolphins' record in the top two tiers since their promotion to the Top East League in 2008 was:

Current squad

The Hino Red Dolphins squad for the 2023 season is:

External links

References

Rugby in Kantō
Rugby clubs established in 1950
Sports teams in Tokyo
1950 establishments in Japan
Japan Rugby League One teams